In 1888 Emperor Alexander III formalised the use of titles in the Imperial House in 1886 (on 2 July 1886 Julian calendar, 14 July 1886 Gregorian) by amendment to the succession laws. Grand Duke belonged henceforward only to sons and paternal grandsons of the Emperors of Russia, and Grand Duchess correspondingly only to daughters and paternal granddaughters, as well as to legitimate wives of Grand Dukes.

One male infant only 9 days old at the time of Alexander's edict thus lost the title. Those Russian dynasts who genealogically were distant from Emperors (as not to be Grand Dukes) were entitled to titulary Prince of Russia. Prince John Konstantinovich of Russia (1886–1918) was apparently the only who lost the grand ducal title accorded by convention at birth but removed by Alexander III. Alexander III's own grandchildren, children of his daughter Xenia Alexandrovna, were not yet born at the time of the edict, and accordingly became "only" Princes of Russia from their births, as they were great-grandchildren of Nicholas I (one generation too far) when looking at the male lineage.

All were styled Highness.

Princes of Russia of the House of Romanov-Holstein-Gottorp

References

External links
 Russia Nobility Association in America